Ghil'ad Zuckermann is an Israeli-born language revivalist and linguist who works in contact linguistics, lexicology and the study of language, culture and identity. Zuckermann is Professor of Linguistics and Chair of Endangered Languages at the University of Adelaide, Australia. He is the president of the Australian Association for Jewish Studies.

Overview
Zuckermann was born in Tel Aviv in 1971 and raised in Eilat. He attended the United World College (UWC) of the Adriatic in 1987–1989. In 1997 he received an M.A. in Linguistics from the Adi Lautman Program at Tel Aviv University. In 1997–2000 he was Scatcherd European Scholar of the University of Oxford and Denise Skinner Graduate Scholar at St Hugh's College, receiving a D.Phil. (Oxon.) in 2000. While at Oxford, he served as president of the Jewish student group L'Chaim Society. As Gulbenkian research fellow at Churchill College (2000–2004), he was affiliated with the Department of Linguistics, Faculty of Modern and Medieval Studies, University of Cambridge. He received a titular Ph.D. (Cantab.) in 2003. Zuckermann is a polyglot, with his past teaching positions ranging across universities in England, China, Australia, Singapore, Slovakia, Israel, and the United States. In 2010-2015 he was China's Ivy League Project 211 "Distinguished Visiting Professor", and "Shanghai Oriental Scholar" professorial fellow, at Shanghai International Studies University. He was Australian Research Council (ARC) Discovery Fellow in 2007-2011 and was awarded research fellowships at various universities in various countries. He was awarded a British Academy Research Grant, Memorial Foundation of Jewish Culture Postdoctoral Fellowship, Harold Hyam Wingate Scholarship and Chevening Scholarship.

Currently, Zuckermann is Professor of Linguistics and Chair of Endangered Languages at the University of Adelaide. He is elected member of the Australian Institute of Aboriginal and Torres Strait Islander Studies and the Foundation for Endangered Languages. He serves as Editorial Board member of the Journal of Language Contact (Brill), consultant for the Oxford English Dictionary (OED), and expert witness in (corpus) lexicography, (forensic) linguistics and trademarks (intellectual property). In 2013-2015 he was President of the Australasian Association of Lexicography (AustraLex). Since February 2017 he has been the president of the Australian Association for Jewish Studies (AAJS). In 2017 Zuckermann secured extensive research funding from Australia's National Health and Medical Research Council (NHMRC) to study effects of Indigenous language reclamation on wellbeing.

Research
Zuckermann applies insights from the Hebrew revival to the revitalization of Aboriginal languages in Australia. According to Yuval Rotem, the Israeli Ambassador to Australia, Zuckermann's "passion for the reclamation, maintenance and empowerment of Aboriginal languages and culture inspired [him] and was indeed the driving motivator of" the establishment of the Allira Aboriginal Knowledge IT Centre in Dubbo, New South Wales, Australia, on 2 September 2010.

He proposes Native Tongue Title, compensation for language loss, because "linguicide" results in "loss of cultural autonomy, loss of spiritual and intellectual sovereignty, loss of soul". He uses the term sleeping beauty to refer to a no-longer spoken language and urges Australia "to define the 330 Aboriginal languages, most of them sleeping beauties, as the official languages of their region", and to introduce bilingual signs and thus change the linguistic landscape of the country. "So, for example, Port Lincoln should also be referred to as Galinyala, which is its original Barngarla name." His edX MOOC Language Revival: Securing the Future of Endangered Languages has had 20,000 learners from 190 countries.

Zuckermann proposes a controversial hybrid theory of the emergence of Israeli Hebrew according to which Hebrew and Yiddish "acted equally" as the "primary contributors" to Modern Hebrew. Scholars including Yiddish linguist Dovid Katz (who refers to Zuckermann as a "fresh-thinking Israeli scholar"), adopt Zuckermann's term "Israeli" and accept his notion of hybridity. Others, for example author and translator Hillel Halkin, oppose Zuckermann's model. In an article published on 24 December 2004 in The Jewish Daily Forward, pseudonymous column "Philologos", Halkin accused Zuckermann of political agenda. Zuckermann's response was published on 28 December 2004 in The Mendele Review: Yiddish Literature and Language.

As described by Reuters in a 2006 article, "Zuckermann's lectures are packed, with the cream of Israeli academia invariably looking uncertain on whether to endorse his innovative streak or rise to the defense of the mother tongue." According to Omri Herzog (Haaretz), Zuckermann "is considered by his Israeli colleagues either a genius or a provocateur".

Reclamation of the Barngarla language
"In 2011 [...] Zuckermann contacted the Barngarla community about helping to revive and reclaim the Barngarla language. This request was eagerly accepted by the Barngarla people and language reclamation workshops began in Port Lincoln, Whyalla and Port Augusta in 2012" (Barngarla man Stephen Atkinson, 2013). The reclamation is based on 170-year-old documents. He tries to convince Eyre Peninsula principals to teach Barngarla at their schools.

Adelaide Language Festival
Zuckermann is the founder and convener of the Adelaide Language Festival.

Contributions to linguistics
Zuckermann's research focuses on contact linguistics, lexicology, revivalistics, Jewish languages, and the study of language, culture and identity.

Zuckermann argues that Israeli Hebrew, which he calls "Israeli", is a hybrid language that is genetically both Indo-European (Germanic, Slavic and Romance) and Afro-Asiatic (Semitic). He suggests that "Israeli" is the continuation not only of literary Hebrew(s) but also of Yiddish, as well as Polish, Russian, German, English, Ladino, Arabic and other languages spoken by Hebrew revivalists.

Zuckermann's hybridic synthesis is in contrast to both the traditional revival thesis (i.e. that "Israeli" is Hebrew revived) and the relexification antithesis (i.e. that "Israeli" is Yiddish with Hebrew words). While his synthesis is multi-parental, both the thesis and the antithesis are mono-parental.

Zuckermann introduces revivalistics as a new transdisciplinary field of enquiry surrounding language reclamation (e.g. Barngarla), revitalization (e.g. Adnyamathanha) and reinvigoration (e.g. Irish). Complementing documentary linguistics, revivalistics aims to provide a systematic analysis especially of attempts to resurrect no-longer spoken languages (reclamation) but also of initiatives to reverse language shift (revitalization and reinvigoration).

His analysis of multisourced neologization (the coinage of words deriving from two or more sources at the same time) challenges Einar Haugen's classic typology of lexical borrowing. Whereas Haugen categorizes borrowing into either substitution or importation, Zuckermann explores cases of "simultaneous substitution and importation" in the form of camouflaged borrowing. He proposes a new classification of multisourced neologisms such as phono-semantic matching.

Zuckermann's exploration of phono-semantic matching in Standard Mandarin and Meiji period Japanese concludes that the Chinese writing system is multifunctional: pleremic ("full" of meaning, e.g. logographic), cenemic ("empty" of meaning, e.g. phonographic – like a syllabary) and simultaneously cenemic and pleremic (phono-logographic). He argues that Leonard Bloomfield's assertion that "a language is the same no matter what system of writing may be used" is inaccurate. "If Chinese had been written using roman letters, thousands of Chinese words would not have been coined, or would have been coined with completely different forms".

Selected publications
Zuckermann has published in English, Hebrew, Italian, Yiddish, Spanish, German, Russian, Arabic, Korean and Chinese.

Books authored

Revivalistics: From the Genesis of Israeli to Language Reclamation in Australia and Beyond. New York: Oxford University Press, 2020.  / .
 (Israelit Safa Yafa)
Language Contact and Lexical Enrichment in Israeli Hebrew. Palgrave Macmillan, 2003.  / .
Mangiri Yarda (Healthy Country: Barngarla Wellbeing and Nature), Revivalistics Press, 2021.
  Barngarlidhi Manoo - Part 2
Dictionary of the Barngarla Aboriginal Language, 2018.
Engaging – A Guide to Interacting Respectfully and Reciprocally with Aboriginal and Torres Strait Islander People, and their Arts Practices and Intellectual Property, 2015.

Books edited
Jewish Language Contact (Special Issue of the International Journal of the Sociology of Language, Vol. 226), 2014.
Burning Issues in Afro-Asiatic Linguistics, 2012.  / .

Journal articles and book chapters

Filmography 
Fry's Planet Word, Stephen Fry interviews Prof. Zuckermann about the revival of Hebrew
The Politics of Language, Stephen Fry interviews Prof. Zuckermann about language 
SBS: Living Black: S18 Ep9 - Linguicide
Babbel: Why Revive A Dead Language? - Interview with Prof. Ghil'ad Zuckermann
edX MOOC: Language Revival: Securing the Future of Endangered Languages

References

External links
University of Adelaide: Researcher Profile: Ghil'ad Zuckermann
University Staff Directory: Ghil'ad Zuckermann 
Ghil'ad Zuckermann, Academia
Ghil'ad Zuckermann's website

1971 births
Living people
People from Tel Aviv
Linguists from Australia
Australian lexicographers
Linguists from Israel
Israeli philologists
Israeli Jews
Australian Jews
Historical linguists
Etymologists
Linguists of Yiddish
Linguists of Hebrew
Linguists of Pama–Nyungan languages
Sociolinguists
Israeli Hebraists
Scholars of nationalism
Israeli emigrants to Australia
Semiticists
Linguists at the University of Cambridge
Academic staff of the University of Adelaide
Academic staff of the University of Queensland
Academic staff of the National University of Singapore
University of Texas at Austin faculty
Academic staff of Shanghai Jiao Tong University
Academic staff of the East China Normal University
Academic staff of Shanghai International Studies University
Academic staff of La Trobe University
Tel Aviv University alumni
Alumni of St Hugh's College, Oxford
Fellows of Churchill College, Cambridge
Israeli translation scholars
People educated at a United World College
20th-century linguists
21st-century linguists
Adi Lautman Interdisciplinary Program for Outstanding Students alumni
Presidents of the Australian Association for Jewish Studies
Language revival
Chevening Scholars